John William von Doussa  (born 17 September 1940) is a former Australian judge and public servant. He was a judge of the Federal Court of Australia from 1988 to 2003, president of the Human Rights and Equal Opportunity Commission from 2003 to 2008, and chancellor of the University of Adelaide from 2004 to 2010.

Early life
Von Doussa attended St Peter's College, Adelaide. He graduated from the University of Adelaide in 1962 with a Bachelor of Laws degree. He was "the fourth generation of his family to take up law", and is a great-grandson of Louis von Doussa.

Legal and judicial career
Von Doussa served his articles of clerkship with Thomson, Hogarth, Ross & Lewis, and was called to the bar in 1963. He served as president of the Law Society of South Australia from 1982 to 1983, and became one of the state's most prominent barristers. In 1986, von Doussa was appointed to the Supreme Court of South Australia. He was elevated to the Federal Court of Australia in 1988, where he would serve until 2003.

In 1994 he presided over the landmark "Carpets Case", in which damages were awarded to a group of Aboriginal artists under the Copyright Act 1968 and Trade Practices Act after their rights to intellectual property were seen to have been infringed by a Perth import company which had used their designs on carpets manufactured in Vietnam.

In 2001, von Doussa delivered a controversial judgment related to the Hindmarsh Island bridge controversy. He held that he was "not satisfied that the restricted women's knowledge was fabricated or that it was not part of genuine Aboriginal tradition". His ruling directly contradicted the earlier findings of the Hindmarsh Island Royal Commission.

Von Doussa was made an additional judge on the Supreme Court of the Australian Capital Territory in 1989, a common appointment for Federal Court judges. He has also received appointments as a non-resident judge on the Court of Appeal of Vanuatu (1997), Supreme Court of Fiji (2003), and Supreme Court of Nauru (2010).

Human Rights Commission
On 1 May 2003, it was announced that von Doussa would replace Alice Tay as President of the Human Rights and Equal Opportunity Commission, with effect from 10 June. For periods in 2006 and 2007, he was also acting Sex Discrimination Commissioner and acting Commissioner Responsible for Age Discrimination. Von Doussa retired from the commission at the end of his five-year term.

Other activities
In July 2004, von Doussa was appointed Chancellor of the University of Adelaide (his alma mater), in place of Robert Champion de Crespigny. He served three two-year terms, retiring in 2010. The following year, he was awarded the honorary degree of Doctor of the University, the university's highest honour, by his successor as chancellor Robert Hill.

References

 

Australian judges on the courts of Nauru
Australian King's Counsel
Chancellors of the University of Adelaide
Judges of the Federal Court of Australia
Judges of the Supreme Court of South Australia
Judges of the Supreme Court of the Australian Capital Territory
Fellows of the Australian Academy of Law
Living people
Australian people of German descent
People educated at St Peter's College, Adelaide
Adelaide Law School alumni
1940 births
Judges of the Industrial Relations Court of Australia
20th-century Australian judges
21st-century Australian judges
Officers of the Order of Australia